Moving Windows is the second and final studio album by American synth-pop trio Our Daughter's Wedding (ODW), released in 1982 by EMI Records. The album was recorded at Intergalactic Studio, except for "Moving Windows" which was recorded at Electric Lady Studios, both studios were located in New York.

Critical reception

In a retrospective review for AllMusic, critic Stephen Schnee wrote of the album, "Relying exclusively on synths, Silva and bandmates Layne Rico and Scott Simon create an intriguing aural landscape. There is not a synthetic beat out of place here, and it is a most enjoyable release. Too bad we didn't get to hear more of them."

Track listing
All songs written by ODW, except ‡ ODW and David Spradley

Side one
"Auto Music"‡ – 3:01
"She Was Someone" – 3:03
"Elevate Her"‡ – 3:29
"Track Me Down" – 3:15
"Daddy's Slave" – 3:59
"Longitude 60°" – 3:19

Side two
"Love Machine"‡ – 3:44* (*time printed on album, actual time 4:33)
"Always Be True" – 2:44
"Moving Windows" – 3:55
"Paris" – 3:14
"Buildings"‡ – 4:20

Personnel
Credits are adapted from the Moving Windows liner notes.
 Layne Rico — synthesizer
 Keith Silva — vocals; keyboards
 Scott Simon — bass synthesizer; saxophone
 David Spradley and ODW — production
 Frank Simon and ODW — production on "She Was Someone"
 Claire Taylor — album design
 Anders Nordström — photography

Special thanks
Bob Currie, Aurthur Ring, Nona Hendryx, J.K., Fred Zarr, Ted Currier, M.O.T.C., Lo Chin

References

External links

1982 albums
Synth-pop albums by American artists
EMI America Records albums